Andrew Nerpin (born November 17, 1986 in Marathon, Ontario) is a Canadian curler from Kelowna, British Columbia. He currently plays second on Team Jim Cotter.

Career
In 2017, Nerpin joined Sean Geall's team as a second, supporting Geall, Jeff Richard and David Harper. The team won the September 2017 King Cash Spiel. In 2018, Team Geall won the provincial championship, defeating Jim Cotter in the final in an extra end.

Personal life
Nerpin works as a power engineer for Imperial Oil. He is currently engaged to Erika Underhill.

References

External links
 

1986 births
Living people
Canadian male curlers
Curlers from British Columbia
Curlers from Ontario
Curlers from Northern Ontario
People from Thunder Bay District
Sportspeople from Kelowna